Amos R. Manning (1810–1880) was a justice of the Supreme Court of Alabama from 1874 to 1880.

Born in Amboy, New Jersey, his family moved to Huntsville, Alabama. He became an Associate Judge of the Supreme Court of Alabama in the 1870s, where "[h]is opinions were remarkable for care and research".

References

Justices of the Supreme Court of Alabama
1810 births
1880 deaths
19th-century American judges